Mateusz Malinowski (born 6 May 1992) is a Polish volleyball player. At the professional club level, he plays for the PlusLiga team, LUK Lublin.

Career

Clubs
In 2011, Malinowski joined Jastrzębski Węgiel. In the same year, he won a silver medal of the Club World Championship. In 2013, Malinowski won a bronze medal of the Polish Championship. During the 2013/2014 season, the team was promoted to the Final Four of the 2013–14 CEV Champions League held in Ankara, and after defeating Zenit Kazan in a third place match, won a bronze medal. Malinowski ended the 2013–14 PlusLiga season with his second bronze medal of the Polish Championship. In 2015, he moved to Cuprum Lubin.

Honours
 FIVB Club World Championship
  Doha 2011 – with Jastrzębski Węgiel

References

External links
 
 Player profile at PlusLiga.pl 
 Player profile at Volleybox.net

1992 births
Living people
People from Piła
Sportspeople from Greater Poland Voivodeship
Polish men's volleyball players
Jastrzębski Węgiel players
Cuprum Lubin players
Warta Zawiercie players
LKPS Lublin players
Opposite hitters